is a Japanese manga written by Masashi Kishimoto and illustrated by Akira Ōkubo. It was serialized in Shueisha's Weekly Shōnen Jump from May 2019 to March 2020, with its chapters collected in five tankōbon volumes. In North America, Viz Media published the series on the Shonen Jump platform, and started the print release of the series in March 2020. Shueisha published it on the Manga Plus platform.

Production
In an interview published in the October issue of Kadokawa's Entermix on August 20, 2015, Kishimoto discussed the ideas for his next work after finishing his famous long-running series Naruto in November 2014. He stated that his new work would be a science fiction manga and he had already finalized the character designs. In the same interview he stated that his next work possibly would not be a weekly serialization, due to a muscle strain put on him by the weekly serialization of Naruto. In an interview published by Jump Giga in August 2016, Kishimoto stated that he already planned his next work and he has already done research for it. In December 2017, at the Jump Festa '18 Boruto: Naruto Next Generations stage panel, Kishimoto displayed several layouts art sequences that he drew for his new work, with a planned 2018 debut for the Weekly Shōnen Jump'''s 50th anniversary.

During the Jump Festa 2019 event in December 2018, Samurai 8: The Tale of Hachimaru was formally announced. The new collaboration between Kishimoto and his former assistant Akira Ōkubo was set to debut in Weekly Shōnen Jump in spring 2019. At the event, Naruto's voice actress Junko Takeuchi read a comment from Kishimoto, which stated that the new manga would combine his love for Japanese culture and aesthetics with his love for science fiction settings and technology. In March 2019, Kishimoto held a press conference at Shueisha to share information about his new work, regarding as how long Samurai 8: The Tale of Hachimaru would be, Kishimoto expected to publish ten volumes or more, stating "I remember saying one time that Naruto would be 15 volumes. It always ends up being longer". Despite Kishimoto's expectations, the series finished with 43 chapters published on March 23, 2020.

PublicationSamurai 8: The Tale of Hachimaru is created, written, and storyboarded by Masashi Kishimoto and illustrated by Akira Ōkubo, who had been an assistant of Kishimoto's on Naruto from the early 2000s till the series' end. A four page preview of the manga was released in Weekly Shōnen Jumps combined issue #22-23 on April 27, 2019, being the final issue published in the Heisei period. Samurai 8: The Tale of Hachimaru began serialization in Weekly Shōnen Jump's #24 issue on May 13, 2019, being the first series in the magazine published in the Japanese Reiwa period. The series finished in the 17th issue of Weekly Shōnen Jump on March 23, 2020. The first two tankōbon volumes were published on October 4, 2019, while the fifth and final volume was published on May 13, 2020.

In North America, Viz Media published the preview chapter and published the chapters simultaneously with the releases in Japan on the Shonen Jump platform, while Shueisha published it on the Manga Plus platform. In October 2019, Viz Media announced that the series would be released in early 2020. In other countries, the volumes in Spain were simultaneously released in October 2019 by Planeta Cómic, in Italy in November 2019 by Panini Comics, in France in December 2019 by Kana, and in Germany starting in April 2020 by Carlsen Manga.

Volume list

Reception
Rebecca Silverman of Anime News Network ranked the first volume as a B−. Silverman considered that the series appeals to younger readers although the good-hearted nature of the series could appeal to older readers as well. She praised Okubo's art but considered the world's lore largely underdeveloped and felt that there are too noticeable gaps in the story's continuity. Karen Maeda of Sequential Tart gave the first volume a 8 out of 10. Maeda said that the manga has many elements which make it interesting and concluded: "The creator of Naruto'' plays a lot in the fantasy landscape. I think this is going to be a pretty fun ride! I highly recommend picking this one up if you want something fun that is pure manga, and if you like dogs that meow."

Notes

References

External links
 

2019 manga
Adventure anime and manga
Samurai in anime and manga
Science fantasy anime and manga
Shōnen manga
Shueisha manga